Jeanine Cicognini (born 14 November 1986) is a Swiss badminton player who now represents Italy. Cicognini won her first Swiss senior title at age 16 and has since won the award seven more times.

Biography 
In 2005, she won the silver medal at the European Junior Badminton Championships in the girls' singles event.

Cicognini became a badminton professional as soon as she left school. She soon moved to Denmark, and  then moved to the International Badminton Federation's training centre in Saarbrücken, Germany. In 2010, she returned to Switzerland and joined the sport army, where she played for the BC Uzwil. She later moved to Mülheim an der Ruhr, Germany and played for the 1.BV Mülheim in the first bundesliga.

At the Olympic Games 2008 in Beijing she reached the second round, losing to Anna Rice of Canada. In 2016, she did not advance to the elimination round after placing third in the group stage.

In 2015, she represented Italy to compete at the European Games in the women's singles event. She was defeated by Line Kjærsfeldt of Denmark 21-10, 25-23 in round of 16.

Achievements

European Junior Championships 
Girls' singles

BWF International Challenge/Series 
Women's singles

  BWF International Challenge tournament
  BWF International Series tournament
  BWF Future Series tournament

References

External links 
 European results
 
 
 

1986 births
Living people
People from Brig-Glis
Swiss female badminton players
Badminton players at the 2008 Summer Olympics
Olympic badminton players of Switzerland
Italian female badminton players
Badminton players at the 2016 Summer Olympics
Olympic badminton players of Italy
Badminton players at the 2015 European Games
European Games competitors for Italy
Badminton players of Fiamme Oro
Sportspeople from Valais